Hartranft is a neighborhood in the central part of North Philadelphia section of Philadelphia, Pennsylvania, United States.

Hartranft is on the border of the predominantly Black central region of North Philadelphia and the predominantly Hispanic eastern region of North Philadelphia. Bounded by 6th Street to the west, Front Street to the east, York Street to the north, and Cecil B. Moore Avenue to the south. Bordering neighborhoods include Fairhill to the north, Kensington to the east, Cecil B. Moore to the west, and Olde Kensington to the south.

Most of the neighborhood is located in the 19122 zip code.

The demolished Northern National Bank building was added to the National Register of Historic Places in 1985.

Demographics
As of the Census of 2010 Hartranft had 15,883 people and was 49.6% Hispanic (primarily Puerto Rican), 29.9% African American, 13% White, and 7.5% mixed or other.

44% of its people live below the poverty line.

The average housing structure was built in 1946. 43.12% of all properties were vacant as of 2000.

Education
School District of Philadelphia operates public schools.

The Free Library of Philadelphia Lillian Marrero Branch serves West Kensington.

References 

Neighborhoods in Philadelphia
Lower North Philadelphia